This is a list of waterfalls in Nepal. They are also called Jharana(Nepali-झरना) in local language.

List

References

Nepal
Waterfalls